Glaspalast may refer to:

Glaspalast (Munich), Glaspalast in Munich modeled after The Crystal Palace
Glaspalast Sindelfingen, an indoor arena in Sindelfingen